Digital River is a private company that provides global e-commerce, payments and marketing services. In 2013, Digital River processed more than $30 billion in online transactions. Digital River is headquartered in Minnetonka, Minnesota.

Company operations
Digital River has a history of acquiring other companies in the e-commerce (including digital software delivery) industry.

Notable acquisitions include:

Simtel
CCNow (2002)
Freemerchant.com (discontinued 15 January 2008)
Journey Education Marketing (2010)
eSellerate
THINK Subscription (2008)
SWREG (2005)
Fatfoogoo (2010)

Divestitures
CCNow (sold to Snorrason Holdings 2012)
Journey Education Marketing (2013)

Security failings
A security breach in 2010 resulted in nearly 200,000 customers' data being stolen. A lawsuit followed by Digital River.

In October 2017, the websites for Equifax, and for TransUnion's Central American division were reported to have been redirecting visitors to websites that attempted drive-by downloads of malware disguised as Adobe Flash updates. The attack had been performed by hijacking third-party analytics JavaScript from FireClick. Digital River decommissioned the FireClick platform and released the domain in 2016, so the domain was not owned by Digital River at the time of the attack.

Management history
Joel Ronning was CEO from the company's founding until stepping down in November 2012. In June 2013, Ronning was ranked as the most overpaid CEO at a public company in Minnesota.

In February 2013, Dave Dobson was named CEO. 

In July 2018, Adam Coyle was named CEO with Mr. Dobson becoming Vice Chairman of the Board. Mr. Coyle had previously been on the board since 2015 and worked as an executive partner with Digital River's private equity owner, Siris Capital.

In January 2020, Christopher Bernander was named CFO.

References

External links
DigitalRiver.com

Software companies based in Minnesota
Companies based in Minnetonka, Minnesota
American companies established in 1994
Software companies established in 1994
Companies formerly listed on the Nasdaq
Online financial services companies of the United States
Online payments
Multinational companies headquartered in the United States
2015 mergers and acquisitions
Software companies of the United States